Blackmailed is a 1920 German crime film directed by Carl Boese and starring Gertrude Welcker and Ernst Deutsch.

The film's sets were designed by the art director August Rinaldi.

Cast
Ernst Deutsch as Manuel Sandt
Karl Falkenberg
Ludwig Rex as blackmailer
Hella Thornegg
Gertrude Welcker as Ebba Lingg

References

External links

Films of the Weimar Republic
Films directed by Carl Boese
German silent feature films
1920 crime films
German crime films
German black-and-white films
1920s German films
1920s German-language films